Clyde Cecil Holloway (November 28, 1943 – October 16, 2016) was an American politician, small business owner, and Republican politician from Louisiana who served as a member of the U.S. House of Representatives and as one of five members of the Louisiana Public Service Commission.

Early life and career 
Clyde was born to James and Ever Holloway as the fourth of seven children. In 1968, he started the Clyde Holloway Nursery with his wife, Catherine K. Holloway. The couple also operated the Forest Hill Speedway for over two decades. He was notable for challenging a federal judge's court order, along with other parents, to shut down the public school in his hometown of Forest Hill.

Political career 
Holloway won election to Louisiana's 8th congressional district as a Republican, and was re-elected two more times before being redistricted to the 6th district and losing re-election. Holloway won the first round of votes against Richard Baker, but lost in the runoff with 49.4% of the vote to Baker's 50.6%. He was a candidate for Governor in the 1991 jungle primary, ultimately running a distant fourth behind Governor Buddy Roemer, State Representative and former Ku Klux Klan wizard David Duke, and the ultimate winner, former Governor Edwin Edwards.

Later career and death 
Holloway served as a member of the Louisiana Public Service Commission since 2009 and was its chairman at the time of his death. He was buried with a memorial arrangement at Forest Hill Town Hall.

References 

1943 births
2016 deaths
Businesspeople from Louisiana
Louisiana Republicans
Members of the Louisiana Public Service Commission
Members of the United States House of Representatives from Louisiana
People from Forest Hill, Louisiana